James Womack may refer to:

James Womack (baseball), African-American baseball player
James E. Womack (born 1941), American biologist
James P. Womack, research director of the International Motor Vehicle Program